Don Emery (11 June 1920 – 19 November 1993) was a Welsh footballer. He played for Swindon Town, Aberdeen and East Fife, and in the late 1950s managed Highland League club Fraserburgh. In 1969 he was part of a consortium that failed in an attempt to unseat and replace the board of Aberdeen FC.

References

External links 

1920 births
1993 deaths
Footballers from Cardiff
Welsh footballers
Association football fullbacks
Cardiff City F.C. players
Swindon Town F.C. players
Aberdeen F.C. players
East Fife F.C. players
English Football League players
Scottish Football League players
Welsh football managers